Cassida saucia is a species of beetle in the leaf beetle family, found in various Asian countries, including Armenia, Azerbaijan, Iran and Turkey. The species feeds on plants in the family Solanaceae, particularly Lycium europaeum.

References

Beetles described in 1889
Beetles of Asia
Cassidinae